The use of markings on British military vehicles expanded and became more sophisticated following the mass production and mechanization of armies in World War II.

Unit marks were sometimes amended at the front to make them less visible when in view of the enemy. Certain other marks were however made more visible in front line areas, such as aerial recognition signs to avoid friendly fire.

There are practical purposes behind most signs such as; allied identification, bridge weight, gas detection, tactical signs, vehicle War Department number and convoy marks. Attempts were made to standardise the size, colour and location of marks, with varying degrees of success.

History 

The marking on military vehicles to identify the country or unit pre-dates the development of mechanical vehicles. The broad arrow used by the British Board of Ordnance to mark government property dates from the 16th century.

Arm of service marks began with the use of service initials, such as S. & M.  (Sappers and Miners), which pre-dated RE  (Royal Engineers).

During World War I the system of identification developed as a result of necessity; formation signs were created before being abandoned after that war ended.

Army, Corps, Independent Brigade and Divisional marks generally use symbols. Regimental, Battalion and parts of a battalion marks tend to use numbers with symbols.

Vehicle registration numbers were used to identify vehicle type and the specific vehicle number. Armoured Fighting Vehicles (AFVs) sometimes adopted personal names. Other marks are used for information, such as weight or maximum speed, to identify friendly vehicles, or to identify the purpose, such as bomb disposal.

Markings usually use stencils. Accordingly, wartime markings are not generally as neat as a hand-painted pre-war mark, and those being done in the field are sometimes in mirror image and often in the wrong location on the vehicle.

National identification 

Prior to 1943, there was no formal British identification. However, BEF vehicles carried a white vertical rectangle patch, 12 inches by 15 inches, on the front of AFVs, on the front left mudguard of softskins and on the sides of carriers. Between 1939 and 1945, some vehicles featured a roundel on the bonnet, front wing, around the windscreen, doors, and on the rear of the vehicle. This was used in the European theatre prior to Dunkirk and after D-Day, in the western desert, and in Italy. In late 1941, an 18 inch square patch with three vertical stripes (white, red, white) was added to AFVs in the western desert. There were between one and six per vehicle, in assorted places. In the spring of 1942, most UK AFVs were painted with a horizontal rectangular patch 18 inches by 10 inches with the same striping pattern as the desert design. Some had the RAC mailed fist flash instead, in a rectangle.

From mid-1943 the Allied star was used on the sides of softskin vehicles and AFVs. A painted Union flag was rarely seen in late war.

Formation signs 

Each vehicle had to carry a formation sign, normally the formation they were permanently attached to. Thus, if temporarily attached to another unit, the vehicle would retain its normal sign unless instructed to adopt the temporary unit sign.

The sign was affixed to the front nearside (left) bumper, or close to it, such as a forward facing wing, and in a prominent position at the rear, also on the nearside. It was of similar size to the Arm of Service (AoS) 9 inch square sign, and was not supposed to be carried on motorbikes, but was sometimes painted on the sides of their fuel tank.

Army and Corps 

Only vehicles attached to the headquarters of an Army and Corps would carry insignia in place of regimental markings. This would include Army and Corps troops that were lent to sub units on an as-needed basis.

Army and Corps vehicles carried normal Arm of Service markings, but with a white top bar.

Independent Brigades 

Independent Brigades could be allocated a special formation sign, used by vehicles not within a division. The same sign was worn by soldiers on their sleeves. Some units stenciled the independent brigade sign on their vehicles whilst keeping their own divisional sign.

Divisions 

Each division had its own insignia, carried by all vehicles. The same sign was worn by soldiers on their sleeves.

It was painted using a stencil, but occasionally hand-painted giving rise to variations. Stencils were on occasion reversed. A few vehicles, such as RASC companies carried both a Corps or Division sign and their company sign. The 21st Army Tank Brigade in North Africa painted the Infantry Division sign (4th) they were supporting, alongside their own.

Non formation signs

Arm of Service 

Discussed in detail from May 1939 the system was summarised in a War Office letter of 12 April 1940 updated in 1941, 1942 and 1943.

All vehicles carried arm of service (AoS) markings comprising a  square with a white two or three digit number (both one and four digits were occasionally used). Where the background colour is pale, the number may be coloured. The background colour explained the AoS, the number differentiated the AoS HQ and the individual battalions or companies within that AoS.

Painted on the offside front bumper or nearby, dependent upon the vehicle, so may be on the front of the wing, glacis or with a jeep, below the windscreen. The sign is repeated on the offside rear. The size is adapted to suit the vehicle and space available.

A white top stripe indicates Corps troops.

A brigade HQ was the first number, then each battalion within the division, going from senior to junior, having a number increasing by one or more number. Service units, postal, provost, ambulance etc. would not have an HQ unit.

Troop carrying vehicles may use removable plates with the AoS sign as they were regularly moved between divisions. They may also have signs that were twice the size, with a black square over the RASC sign, the unit information of the troop being transported being chalked on the black square.

Headquarters, provost, medical, training & postal units in a division used a black panel with white numbers.

War department census number 

A letter designating the type of vehicle followed by a number painted white with 3½ inch high, 2 inch wide stencil on the sides of the bonnet and on the tailboard of softskins, if no bonnet, then on cab door. AFV's painted theirs on the sides, sometimes on glacis in early war. Light blue was used on airborne vehicles and black on vehicles with desert camouflage. Motorcycles used half sized numbers on either side of the fuel tank or on plates front and back.

Each War Department order allocated a sequence of numbers to paint onto the vehicles as they were built and left the factory.

In the 1930s census numbers began with the year.. 37... 38... etc. . By 1942 the system had changed with blocks of numbers of four to seven digits being issued. Canadian army vehicles used the same census number as British vehicles, with the addition of a prefix C.

E, P and S were introduced later during the war. Until 1941 in the middle east vehicles used WD rather than a prefix letter and often had the numbers repeated in Arabic. Pre war civilian number plates on military vehicles continued during 1940 in the UK and in the BEF.

Aerial recognition symbols

There were no formal instructions before the war, but experiments included:
 1941 (1) A 2in white border around the turret top of AFVs
 1941 (2) A yellow fabric triangle to indicate an AFV radio vehicle
 1941/2 A white St Andrews cross on lorries in North Africa

In January 1942, an RAF style roundel was introduced. It was 31in wide, to be placed on the cab roof or bonnet of lorries and the turret or engine deck of armoured vehicles. The roundel comprised a 6in yellow surround, a 10in blue band, a 10in white band, and a 5in red centre. It was used in the UK, the Middle East and Italy.

From mid 1943, an allied white five-pointed star within a white circle was adopted.  Painted on a horizontal surface of a size suitable for the surface area, standard diameter being 60in, 45in, 36in, 32in, 25in, 20in or 15in. The circle was sometimes complete, sometimes broken at the star points. Not to be placed where the star would be covered by equipment, canvas, fuel cans etc. On a horizontal surface a point faced the front of the vehicle, on a glacis a point faced upwards.

From mid 1944 a coloured plastic panel supplemented the star on some vehicles, pink, yellow or white, with a colour of the day chosen randomly.

Allied star 

A five-pointed star, painted white, was used to identify Allied vehicles from 1944. British tanks rarely had stars on the front or sides, normally just one on the rear of the turret. AFVs often carried stars on the sides and rear. Softskins normally carried stars on their sides. The star was normally 8-12in and was stencilled with a point upwards.

Bridge rating

All vehicles had a bridge rating, displayed on a yellow circle, with black writing. The circle was for most vehicles on an attached plate, 7½ inches to 9 inches diameter. Tanks and many other AFVs had the marking painted on their hull. The location is normally offside front, sometimes attached to radiators.

The number equated to the bridge category, very roughly based on weight with adjustments for axle loading and impact factors, rounded up. Where the vehicle normally has a trailer, the writing showed two numbers, the upper being the loaded vehicle with the loaded trailer, the lower just the loaded vehicle.

A Jeep, if it had a trailer, would have 3/2. A 15cwt truck with a trailer could have 5/4, 6/4 or 6/5 or 7/5, dependent upon the vehicle load and trailer size and load.  A Diamond T transporter tractor with a trailer with a Sherman should carry 70/18 on its plate.

Motorbikes and motorbike sidecars did not have bridge plates, they fell into category 1.

In the field, the bright yellow sign facing forward was considered too visible so was often toned down, repainted as a yellow hollow circle or discarded.

Tactical signs 

Tactical signs used on AFVs, HQ Squadron – diamond, A Squadron – triangle, B squadron – square, C squadron – circle and D squadron – solid vertical bar, indicated the squadron within a regiment. Divisional troops and unbrigaded units such as armoured car and armoured recce regiments used white tac signs. Within an armoured brigade each regiment used a different colour which indicated their seniority. Red for the senior regiment, yellow for the 2nd regiment, blue for the junior regiment, and green for the motorised infantry battalion.

They were 8-12 inches high, depending on the size of the vehicle, and were usually located on the sides or rear of the turret, or on the sides of the hull. They sometimes included a number identifying the individual vehicle.

Gas detection 

Gas detection panels were painted as an 18-inch square patch on AFVs and on the rear of headlamps of softskins until October 1943, thereafter as a patch on bonnets of softskins, close to the windscreen and not on AFV's. The gas detection paint was a khaki yellow colour.

Other markings

Convoy marking 

A number, written in chalk, to mark convoy position, written on front of vehicle. The lead vehicle flew a blue flag, the rear vehicle a green flag.

A small light shining on the rear axel, the centre of which was painted white, assisted night time convoys. Some vehicles used a circular disc painted white.

Left hand drive 

Vehicles that were left-hand drive had CAUTION LEFT HAND DRIVE in 2 inch white letters on the rear. If the vehicle has no indicators, the words NO SIGNALS was added.

Civilian vehicles 

Requisitioned vehicles, before they received their full markings, displayed WD in 6 inch letters on the nearside front and back.

Speed limit 

Maximum permitted speed limited was painted in red on the rear tailboard of softskins. The speed 4 inch high above MPH in 2 inch letters, (not put on Bomb disposal vehicles or motorbikes).

Shipping and rail loading marks 

Temporary 5 or 6 digit number chalked or roughly painted prior to shipping overseas. There may also be the landing craft number marked on the vehicle, such as "LST 368". Two or three colour horizontal stripes in a rectangle were sometimes painted next to the number, being specific to a vehicle movement order. Vehicle size and weight were chalked on a square painted black panel with a white edge.

Vehicles and trailers shipped on aircraft had a vertical yellow 6 inch line, ¾ inch wide, showing the centre of gravity, ½ inch wide on motorbikes.

Personalised markings

AFVs, mainly tanks, sometimes had names painted on their exterior to aid identification to other tankers. Troop B, using names that were often themed, such as flowers, villages, or girls names beginning with B.

Slogans and graffiti were on occasions added, sometimes inspiring – Berlin or Bust, wishful thinking – Home by Christmas, mottos – Death or Glory, poetry, a persons or place name, crude slang, comic etc. Using paint or chalk these unofficial markings were discouraged but existed.

Specialist vehicles

Bomb disposal 

Bomb disposal vehicles had bright red painted wheel arches. The words BOMB DISPOSAL or B.D.S. in 4 inch red letters on the front of vehicle. Near side lights to have blue filter. Vehicle may show a red flag.

Ambulance 

Conforming with international recognition, a white square of maximum size for vehicle on roof and both sides with a red cross. At rear on each door a white 18 inch circle with red cross.

RAF vehicles 

RAF roundel instead of formation sign on right front and right rear bumper or mudguard. They also wore a code consisting of a letter indicating the Command and a number indicating the group, in white. e.g. B/3 Indicating 3 Group, Bomber Command. Vehicles in Europe after D-Day would wear 'TAF' followed by the group number ( 2, 83, 84, 85) Vehicle numbers were RAF – followed by up to six digit number, usually on the front and rear, but sometimes following army practice. From 1943 a 4 digit type number would be painted on the door, or side of the cab. After Jan 1945, mobile units wore a  the unit number and a three letter code indicating the type of unit, in a hollow white rectangle, e.g. 2679 MSU. The official air recognition symbol for RAF vehicles was the roundel, which was normally placed on the sides of the body.

Artillery and anti-tank guns 

Guns rarely carried any normal marking on the gun shield. No tactical signs were used. The Royal Artillery had a system of red and blue flashes to indicate sub units, with a red square moving clockwise over a blue background to indicate 1st, 2nd, 3rd and 4th battery.

Other 

Military police, Royal Navy-RN, Royal Marines-RM and NAAFI signs were painted on their vehicles and trailers.

Examples of other units and markings

See also

 British armoured fighting vehicles of World War II
 British Army during the Second World War
 U.S. military vehicle markings of World War II

References

 George Forty, "British Army Handbook 1939–1945", Stroud: Sutton Publishing, 1998, .

External links
 Formation badges
 Royal Navy vehicle records
 RAF vehicle records
 Tank vehicle records
 Royal Engineer construction vehicle records

World War II vehicles of the United Kingdom
Vehicle markings